Mohasin may refer to:

People
Lev Mosin (1992–), a Russian sprinter
Maksim Mosin (1982–), a Russian professional football player
Sergei Ivanovich Mosin (1849–1902), a Russian military officer, engineer, and a designer of the Mosin–Nagant rifle
Vasily Mosin, (1972–), a Russian sport shooter who specializes in the double trap

Other
The Mosin language, spoken in Vanua Lava Island in Vanuatu. 
The Mosin–Nagant, a five-shot, bolt-action, internal magazine-fed, military rifle, developed by the Imperial Russian Army in 1882–91, and used by the armed forces of the Russian Empire, the Soviet Union and various other nations
The 7.62 Tkiv 85, a Finnish modification of the Mosin–Nagant to be a designated marksman/sniper rifle
The Karabinek wz. 91/98/23, a Polish modification of the Mosin–Nagant to carbine form